Dumalneg, officially the Municipality of Dumalneg, is a 5th class municipality in the province of Ilocos Norte, Philippines. According to the 2020 census, it has a population of 3,087 people.

Until 2013 when the writ of execution was issued, Dumalneg was composed of only a single barangay of the same name. On August 10, 2012, the Supreme Court ruled in favor of Dumalneg in its territorial dispute with neighboring Bangui over the jurisdiction of Barangay San Isidro.

Geography 
Dumalneg is border by Pagudpud in the north; Adams in the east; Vintar in the south and Bangui in the west. It has a land area of 88.48 km2 and it is a land-locked municipality. Nearly all parts of Dumalneg are mountainous. Only the starting of Dumalneg is well inhabited.

Barangays 
Dumalneg is politically divided in 4 barangays. These barangays are headed by elected officials: Barangay Captain, Barangay Council, whose members are called Barangay Councilors. All are elected every three years.
 Cabaritan
 Kalaw
 Quibel
 San Isidro

The former Barangay Dumalneg was split into Barangay Cabaritan, Barangay Kalaw, and Barangay Quibel in pursuant to Republic Act No. 10955, which was ratified through a plebiscite conducted by the COMELEC on March 24, 2018.

Climate

Demographics

Dumalneg's population is predominantly made up of Ilocano and Apayao people.

Economy

Transportation 

There are few jeepneys that are going to Dumalneg. Tricycles are the main transportation to the town. Dumalneg is a landlocked town, and the only way to get there is via the Dumalneg Road, starting on the highway in Barangay Lanao, Bangui, to the Town's Proper.

Government 
Dumalneg, belonging to the first congressional district of the province of Ilocos Norte, is governed by a mayor designated as its local chief executive and by a municipal council as its legislative body in accordance with the Local Government Code. The mayor, vice mayor, and the councilors are elected directly by the people through an election which is being held every three years.

Elected officials

Tourism 
There are few attractions in Dumalneg. Mainly the Bolo River, locally known as "Ar-ar-o", the place where peoples of Bangui and Pagudpud also going in the said river. Also the view of the mountains of Vintar are considered also the town's attraction.

References

External links
[ Philippine Standard Geographic Code]
Philippine Census Information
Local Governance Performance Management System

Municipalities of Ilocos Norte